Louis Slobodkin (February 19, 1903 – May 8, 1975) was an American sculptor, writer, and illustrator of numerous children's books.

Life
Slobodkin was born on February 19, 1903, in Albany, New York. He attended the Beaux-Arts Institute of Design in New York City from 1918 to 1923. He supported himself by working as an elevator operator, a dishwasher, and in factory jobs.

Slobodkin married Florence Gershkowitz, a poet and children's book writer in 1927. They had two children, Lawrence and Michael. He died of a heart attack at his home in Bay Harbor Islands, Florida on May 8, 1975.

Career
Teaching himself all manner of art from an early age, Slobodkin began to sculpt art at the age of ten. During the early 1930s he served as an assistant to Malvina Hoffman while she was creating the sculptures that would constitute The Races of Mankind exhibition at the Field Museum of Natural History.

His first brush with fame came as a cause célèbre in 1938 when his statue "Abraham Lincoln, Rail Fence Mender" appeared at the 1939–1940 World's Fair. When Slobodkin went to see it with his wife, the statue had been removed. Varying excuses were given as to why, including that it was too large for the space and casting shadows, and that a woman was offended by the sight of it. Fair Commissioner Edward J. Flynn eventually confirmed that the statue had been destroyed. Slobodkin waged a press campaign to gin up outrage at the destruction and earn a new commission to recast the statue in bronze. The new version was placed in the Headquarters Building of the Department of the Interior in Washington, DC, and another plaster version resides in Lincoln, Nebraska.

Slobodkin did not immediately become involved with children's literature. He illustrated his first children's book in 1941, The Moffats, by his friend, Eleanor Estes, with whom he collaborated on five more books. In 1944, he won the Caldecott Medal for illustrating Many Moons, written by James Thurber.  He wrote and illustrated the popular The Space Ship Under the Apple Tree book series. He was also the author of Sculpture; Principles and Practice.

During his career, Slobodkin illustrated nearly 90 books, 50 of which he also wrote. He collaborated with his wife on five books from 1958 to 1969, including The Cowboy Twins (1960). Slobodkin's last book was Wilbur the Warrior, published in 1972.

Selected works

Children's Books
As author and illustrator:
Clear the Track for Michael's Magic Train (1945)
The Adventures of Arab (1946)
The Seaweed Hat (1947)
Hustle and Bustle (1948)
Bixxy and the Secret Message (1949)
Circus April 1 (1953)
Mr. Petersand's Cats (1954)
Millions and Millions and Millions (1955)
The Amiable Giant (1955)
One is Good, But Two Are Better (1956)
The Little Mermaid Who Could Not Sing (1956)
Melvin the Moose Child (1957)
The Wide-Awake Owl (1958)
Too Many Mittens (1958), illustrator and co-author with Florence Slobodkin 
Gogo and the French Seagull (1960)
The Late cuckoo (1962)
Io Sono (I am): Italian with Fun (1960)
A Good Place to Hide (1961)
Moon Blossom and Golden Penny (1963)
Luigi and the Long-Nosed Soldier (1963)
Picco the Sad Italian Pony (1964)
The Polka-Dot Goat (1964)
Yasu and the Strangers (1965)
Colette and the Princess (1965)
Read about the Busman (1967)
Spaceship Under the Apple Tree series
Spaceship Under the Apple Tree (1952)
Spaceship Returns to the Apple Tree (1958)
Three-Seated Spaceship (1958)
Round-Trip Spaceship (1968)
Spaceship in the Park (1972)

Autobiographical
Fo'castle Waltz (1945) – novel for adults, an illustrated account of Slobodkin's short career as a sailor aboard the tramp S.S. Hermanita

Non-fiction
Sculpture: Principles and Practice (1958)
The First Book of Drawing (1958)

As illustrator
The Moffats (1941), written by Eleanor Estes
The Middle Moffat (1942), Eleanor Estes
Rufus M (1943), Eleanor Estes
Many Moons (1943), James Thurber
The Hundred Dresses (1944), Eleanor Estes
Young Man of the House (1946), Mabel Leigh Hunt
 The Adventures of Tom Sawyer (1946 reprint by World Publishing Co.) Mark Twain
Jonathan and the Rainbow (1948), Jacob Blanck
Red Head (1951), by Edward Eager
Gertie the Horse Who Thought and Thought (1951), Margarite Glendinning
The Alhambra (1953), Washington Irving
 Love and Knishes: An Irrepressible Guide to Jewish Cooking" (1956), Sara KasdanClean Clarence (1959), Priscilla Friedrich and Otto FriedrichThe Cowboy Twins (1960), Florence SlobodkinA Thousand for Sicily (1961), Geoffrey TreaseThe Beautiful Culpeppers'' (1963), Marion Upington

References

External links

Archives
Louis Slobodkin Papers in the de Grummond Children's Literature Collection at the University of Southern Mississippi.
Louis Slobodkin Papers at the University of Oregon.

Bibliography
Louis Slobodkin at the Internet Archive

General Information

 
Io Sono, the Louis Slobodkin website

1903 births
1975 deaths
American children's writers
Caldecott Medal winners
American children's book illustrators
Artists from Albany, New York
Writers from Albany, New York
20th-century American sculptors
20th-century American male artists
American male sculptors
People from Bay Harbor Islands, Florida
Sculptors Guild members
Section of Painting and Sculpture artists
Sculptors from New York (state)
Beaux-Arts Institute of Design (New York City) alumni